Danylo Panchenko (born 15 August 1973) is a Ukrainian luger. He competed at the 1998 Winter Olympics and the 2002 Winter Olympics.

References

External links
 

1973 births
Living people
Ukrainian male lugers
Olympic lugers of Ukraine
Lugers at the 1998 Winter Olympics
Lugers at the 2002 Winter Olympics
Sportspeople from Lviv